The Waco N series is a range of 1930s American-built cabin biplanes with a fixed tricycle undercarriage produced by the Waco Aircraft Company.

Design and development

Waco introduced the luxury N-series biplane in 1937.  It was based on the Waco C-series five-seat custom-cabin Waco with that model's curved pointed wings, but with an unusual fixed tricycle undercarriage and a modified tail with a lower rudder extension to give increased side area. The Waco N was fitted with flaps on all four wings to improve the aircraft's landing characteristics.

Operational history

The prototype, was designated ZVN-7, with the '7' indicating its year of manufacture (1937), and was powered by the  Jacobs L-5 engine. Only around 20 examples of the N series were completed, as the AVN-8, and ZVN-8. A few were impressed by the USAAC during the Second World War as the UC-72J and UC-72L. One AVN-8 was used by the Royal Aircraft Establishment at Farnborough, Hampshire, for trials with tricycle landing gear.

An example of the AVN-8 is maintained in airworthy condition by the Historic Aircraft Restoration Museum at Creve Coeur Airport near St Louis Missouri.

Variants

ZVN-7 and ZVN-8  Jacobs L-5
AVN-8  Jacobs L-6 engine

Specifications (AVN-8)

References

Notes

Bibliography

1930s United States civil utility aircraft
N series
Sesquiplanes
Single-engined tractor aircraft
Aircraft first flown in 1937